The gastronomy of the province of Valladolid comprises the meals, their preparation, and the culinary habits of the province of Valladolid. It is based on barbecued and roast food, especially roasted Spanish cuisine. Wines of high quality highlight the meals.

Ingredients

Cereals 
A large amount and variety of cereals (wheat, maize, barley, rye) are grown locally and form the basis of high-quality breads.

Vegetables 
Between the cookeds is the cooked Spanish (with "ball" to which is added for flavoring spearmint), sopa de chícharos (or guisantes) (pea soup) which is prepared with peas (in Spanish, pea is guisante or chícharo). The coliflor al ajoarriero (cauliflower in garlic). Between the legumes are dishes such as alubias con patuño de cerdo (beans with pork leg). Within the cereals are the pans and its derivatives as the sopa de ajo garlic soup, the sopa de bestia cansada (soup of beast tired) of Medina del Campo to be offered to the mules of the muleteers. It is an area of ajoarrieros (which means muledriversgarlic), for example ajo de Vallelado (garlic of Vallelado).

Meats 
Meats and sausages in the region are famous for their unique flavor. The province belongs to the area of Spanish-style barbecued roasts.

Dishes include lechazo asado (roast veal or lamb), cochinillo asado (roast suckling pig), cordero asado (roast lamb), morcilla (blood sausage or black pudding), asados al Sarmiento (roasted meat with wine), a typical dish in Santibáñez de Valcorba and environs, chuletones de buey (a large ox steak) with ajillo (garlic), typical in Peñafiel). The embutido (sausage) called chitas (cheetahs) is well known, prepared with the meat of suckling pig in adobo.

Other pork-based sausages are morcilla de Valladolid (black pudding from Valladolid spiced with a special kind of onion), and salchichas (sausages) from Zaratán. Chorizo is also used in dishes such as tortilla de chorizo (chorizo omelette).

Of the smaller game, there are preparations such as the conejo a la cazadora (rabbit to the hunter).

Seafood 
Among the fish, like other Castilian provinces there are trout dishes, an example being the truchas con jamón (trout with ham).

Confectionery, desserts 
The pastries of the province include specialities such as bolla de chicharrones (pork rind cake), rosquillas de palo (stick donuts), mariquitas (ladybirds), roscados (donuts), mantecados de Portillo, roscos de yema (yolk roscos), rosquillas de trancalapuerta (donuts of trancalapuerta), bizcochos de Santa Clara of Tordesillas (Santa Clara cakes), hojuelas (flakes), bizcochos de cura (cakes of cure).

Other generic dishes popular in the province include arroz con leche (rice pudding).

Special dishes 
It is common during Holy Week to consume special food that is part of the Gastronomy of Holy Week (mainly desserts).

At Christmas, the Gastronomy of Christmas  is abundant and diverse, with many sweet dishes, such as turrón, the polvorones of Tordesillas being the most famous, Date palm, marzipan, and Dragées.

It is also usual eat typical dishes of dates, such as suckling pig, chicken, turkey, capon, lamb and mutton, and bream and prawns (in addition to other seafood).

On 31 December (new year) it is a tradition to eat Twelve Grapes to the rhythm of the first twelve bells of the new year.

In the early morning of 1 January "chocolate with churros" is often eaten, either at home with families or in a chocolatier, coffeehouse, or bar. On 6 January (Day of the Three Kings) it is usual to eat the traditional roscón de reyes (king cake).

Wines 
Wines from the province of Valladolid are among the best in the world due to their outstanding taste and quality. Many of the most famous come from the Vega Sicilia winery. The province has five wines with a denomination of origin. Wines with a Rueda Denomination of Origin were court wines at the time of the Catholic Monarchs. They are produced from a range of verdejo grapes, and to a lesser measure from Sauvignon blanc cultivars. Under this appellation there are white, sparkling, red, pink and liquor wines. For their part, the wines of Ribera del Duero are elaborated with the ink on the country and you can taste red wines young, reserve wine and old vine. Wines of the Toro Designation of Origin are mainly white, rosé and red; the wines of Tierra de León Denomination of Origin are white, rosé and red and finally, there are the rosé wines of the Cigales denomination of Origin

Summary list of typical products 

 Lechazo asado (roast lechazo, veal or lamb)
 Cochinillo asado (Roast suckling pig)
 Cordero asado (roast lamb)
 Morcilla (Blood sausage or Black pudding)
 Tapa (Appetizers or snacks)
 Bolla de chicharrones (pork rind cake)
 Gallo turresilano (Stewed cockerel)
 Mantecados de Portillo (Mantecados of Portillo)
 Gallina en pepitoria (chicken in egg and almond sauce)
 Queso pata de mulo de Villalón de Campos (Pata de mulo, cheese of Villalón de Campos)
 Ciegas de Iscar (Blind of Iscar)
 Pasta Castañuelas de Iscar (Pasta Castanets of Iscar)
 Rosquillas de Palo (Bread donuts)
 Sopa de ajo (garlic soup)
 Lagunillas de Laguna de Duero (Small lake of Laguna de Duero)
 Feos de Tordesillas (Ugly of Tordesillas)
 Amarguillos (small bitter)
 Conejo (rabbit)
 Pichones estofados (stewed pigeon)
 Tortas de chicharrones (pork rind cake)
 Tortilla de chorizo (chorizo omelette)
 Morcilla de Valladolid (black pudding of Valladolid)
 Morcilla de Cigales (black pudding of Cigales)
 Piñones de Pedrajas de San Esteban (pine nuts of Pedrajas de San Esteban)
 Esparragos de Tudela de Duero (asparagus of Tudela de Duero)
 Borrachos y Pastas de vino de Peñafiel (Drunken and Pastas with wine of Peñafiel)
 Sopa de chícharos (pea soup)
 Arroz con leche (rice pudding)
 Almendras Garrapiñadas de Villafrechos (Garrapinyades almonds of Villafrechos)
 Pan de la provincia de Valladolid (Bread of the province of Valladolid)
 Salchichas de Zaratán (sausages of Zaratán)
 Ajos de Portillo (garlic of Portillo)
 Endivias de Peñafiel (envy of Peñafiel)
 Ajo de Vallelado (garlic of Vallelado)
 Lechuga de Valladolid (lettuce of Valladolid)
 Vino de Cigales  (Wine of Cigales)
 Vino de Ribera de Duero (Wine of Ribera de Duero) 
 Vino de Rueda (Wine of Rueda) 
 Vino de Tierra de León (Wine of Tierra de León)
 Vino of Toro (Wine of Toro)

See also 
 Castilian-Leonese cuisine
 Spanish cuisine
 List of Spanish dishes
 Province of Valladolid

References

External links 

Web oficial del Concurso Nacional de Pinchos y Tapas y Campeonato Mundial de Tapas (In Valladolid)
Spain in flavors (Valladolid)
 The winning pinchos from the Valladolid contest
 Gastronomic Heritage of Castile and Leon
 Enoturismo y Gastronomía de la provincia de Valladolid (Spanish)
 D.O. Ribera del Duero
 D.O. Cigales
 D.O. Rueda
 D.O. Toro

Spanish cuisine
Castilian-Leonese cuisine
Province of Valladolid
Valladolid